Freeman is a neighborhood of Bramwell, Mercer County, West Virginia, United States. Freeman had its own post office, which closed on June 27, 2009.

The community was named after John Freeman, the proprietor of a local mine.

References

Geography of Mercer County, West Virginia
Neighborhoods in West Virginia
Coal towns in West Virginia